Aigaleo or Egaleo, and known in antiquity as Poikilon Oros (Ποικίλον Όρος), is a mountain in Athens, Attica, Greece. It lies west of Athens plain, southeast of Eleusis, and east of the island of Salamis. Most of the mountain is rocky (limestone). It is lower than Hymettus. Most of the forest is to its north where the Daphni Monastery is located. There is also a park in its northern reaches.

With its good view of the Straits of Salamis, Mount Egaleo was the site of Xerxes' throne from which he observed the Battle of Salamis.

Towns and places that surround the mountain include Perama, Drapetsona, Nikaia, Korydallos, the highway, and Chaidari.  The Athens Metro connects the area after reducing Iera Odos (Sacred Way) into two lanes in 2002–2003.

A highway linking GR-8 and Keratsini runs through this mountain range. The refineries of Skaramangas are in the north. The new bypass on the northwestern part of the range is part of the Attiki Odos superhighway system, the Aigaleo Ring (Number 65) which was opened on January, 2004 along with the rest of the superhighway northwest of the range.  The ring presently does not have full access with Athinon Avenue and GR-8 yet, but includes two interchanges.

References

Mountains of Attica
Mountains of Greece
Battle of Salamis
Landforms of Piraeus (regional unit)
Landforms of West Athens (regional unit)